Qaleh-ye Kasian (also Romanized as Qal‘eh-ye Kāsīān and Qal‘eh-ye Kāseyān; also known as Kāsīān, Kāsīān-e Bālā, Kāsīān Qal‘eh, Kāsīyān, and Khāsīān) is a village in Beyranvand-e Jonubi Rural District, Bayravand District, Khorramabad County, Lorestan Province, Iran. At the 2006 census, its population was 71, in 16 families.

References 

Towns and villages in Khorramabad County